Zenith Glacier is a glacier which lies 1 mile (1.6 km) west of Johnstone Glacier and drains south from the south end of Lanterman Range, Bowers Mountains. So named by the New Zealand Geological Survey Antarctic Expedition (NZGSAE) to northern Victoria Land, 1967–68, because the glacier is an important geological outcrop area with an impressive view from the top (the head of the glacier) of much of the Bowers Mountains.

Glaciers of Pennell Coast